Anthony Paul Bamford, Baron Bamford,  (born 23 October 1945) is a British billionaire businessman who is chairman of J. C. Bamford (JCB). He succeeded his father, Joseph Cyril Bamford, as chairman and managing director of the company in 1975, at the age of 30. He was knighted in 1990 at the age of 45. He has appeared in the Sunday Times Rich List, and in 2021 his net worth was estimated at US$9.48billion. Bamford is a car collector whose collection includes two examples of the rare Ferrari 250 GTO, valued upwards of $70 million each.

Education
Bamford was educated at Ampleforth College, followed by the University of Grenoble.

Life and career

In 1974, Bamford sued the then MP Jeffrey Archer for bankruptcy after Archer failed to repay a £172,000 loan. Archer had lost the money in a fraudulent share scam. Archer later repaid the money from his earnings as a novelist and Bamford subsequently withdrew the bankruptcy notice.

In 2000, JCB was fined £22 million by the European Commission for antitrust breaches. Bamford said the decision was "disappointing and wrong". A six-year legal battle ensued, which resulted in the European Court of Justice upholding the penalty.

Outside of business, Bamford is a well-known collector of early vintage Ferraris, and is the only individual to own two Ferrari 250 GTOs. He was once the owner of a 1954 Mercedes-Benz W196 Grand Prix car raced by the five-time world champion Juan Manuel Fangio of Argentina, and in August 2006, he expressed an interest in purchasing Jaguar Cars but backed out when he was told the sale would also involve Land Rover, which he did not wish to buy.

Bamford is married to Carole, Lady Bamford and has four children.  He is close to Tony Blair, King Charles III and Boris Johnson, having provided Daylesford House for his wedding party in July 2022.

A few months before Bamford joined the House of Lords, he shut down a company he had owned that was registered in the British Virgin Islands, a tax haven according to the Panama Papers. The company was called Casper Ltd. and was formed in 1994. Bamford was the sole shareholder. A spokesman for Bamford told The Guardian in 2016 that Casper Ltd. never owned any assets, had a bank account or engaged in any activity during its entire existence.

Politics

Bamford is a major donor to the UK Conservative Party, with JCB and related Bamford entities giving the party £8.1m in cash or kind between 2007 and 2017.

He donated £1 million before the 2010 General Election, and Prime Minister David Cameron recommended him for a peerage that same year, however Bamford withdrew his name from consideration days before the members were announced.

In 2012, Bamford was later outspoken on the need for the UK Government to champion manufacturing in the UK and commissioned a report in 2012 on the subject which was sent directly to David Cameron. He was elevated to the House of Lords in August 2013, when he took the title "Baron Bamford" of Daylesford in the County of Gloucestershire and of Wootton in the County of Staffordshire.

In June 2016, Bamford wrote a letter in support of voting to leave the European Union to his employees. In October 2016, he led his company to leave the CBI over the organisation's anti-Brexit stance. JCB also donated £100,000 to Vote Leave, the official pro-Brexit group. In May 2021, Bamford rejected an invitation to rejoin the CBI, after previously having called it a "waste of time" that "didn’t represent my business or private companies".

During the 2019 general election campaign Bamford donated £3,935,984 to the Conservative Party.

In 1961, Bamford incorporated a company called JCB Research, described in media as an "obscure company". Between 2001 and 2010, JCB Research donated over £4.5 million to Conservative politicians, although it was only reportedly worth £27,000 at the end of 2010.

Personal life
Bamford owns mansions in several countries; in England they include Daylesford House and Wootton Lodge. Although he was linked to offshore tax havens in the Panama papers through sole ownership of Casper Ltd., his spokesman said the company was inactive for its entire existence before being dissolved in 2012.

One of Anthony Bamford's sons, Jo Bamford, is a businessman. After working at the JCB company, he founded a green hydrogen investment fund and in 2019 purchased Northern Irish company Wrightbus, who manufacture buses including London's double-deckers.

Car collection 
Bamford is a prolific car collector with an interest in rare vintage Ferraris. His car collection is valued in excess of £260 million and includes:

 Ferrari 250 GTO s/n 3767
 Ferrari 250 GTO s/n 4399
 Ferrari 250 Testa Rossa
 Ferrari F12tdf
 Mercedes-Benz 300 SLR (Uhlenhaut Coupé)
 Aston Martin DBR2
 Aston Martin DB4 GT

Styles and honours
 Mr Anthony Bamford (1945–90)
 Sir Anthony Bamford (1990–2002)
 Sir Anthony Bamford DL (2002–2013)
 The Right Honourable The Lord Bamford DL (2013–present)

References 

1945 births
British car collectors
Deputy Lieutenants of Staffordshire
English billionaires
English businesspeople
JCB (company)
Knights Bachelor
Conservative Party (UK) life peers
Knights of the Ordre national du Mérite
Living people
People educated at Ampleforth College
People from Staffordshire
Grenoble Alpes University alumni
British Eurosceptics
Conservative Party (UK) donors
Life peers created by Elizabeth II